The 2017 Seattle Reign FC season was the club's fifth season of play in the National Women's Soccer League (NWSL), the top division of women's soccer in the United States.

Incorporating schedule disruptions caused by the 2015 FIFA Women's World Cup and the 2016 Summer Olympics, teams competed in 24 games during the regular season, a schedule last played during the 2014 season.

Club

Coaching staff

Current roster 
As of September 1, 2017

Competitions 

All match times are listed in PT unless otherwise noted.

Preseason

Regular season

Regular-season standings

Results summary

Results by matchday

Appearances and goals

|-
|colspan="14"|Goalkeepers:
|-

|-
|colspan="14"|Defenders:
|-

|-
|colspan="14"|Midfielders:
|-

|-
|colspan="14"|Forwards:
|-

|-
|colspan="14"|Players who left the club during the season:

Awards

The 100 Best Footballers in The World

 No. 16: Megan Rapinoe
 No. 22: Jess Fishlock
 No. 45: Nahomi Kawasumi
 No. 56: Lydia Williams

NWSL season awards

 Most Valuable Player: Megan Rapinoe, finalist
 Best XI: Jess Fishlock
 Second XI: Megan Rapinoe

Team season awards
Reign FC team season awards are voted on by the players, coaches, and technical staff at the club.

 Golden Boot: Megan Rapinoe (12)
 Most Valuable Player: Rumi Utsugi
 Unsung Hero: Elli Reed
 Offensive Player of the Year: Megan Rapinoe
 Defensive Player of the Year: Rebekah Stott
 Best Social Media Game: Haley Kopmeyer and Katie Johnson

Fan season awards
 Game of the Year: vs. Sky Blue FC, July 22.
 Goal of the Year: Jess Fishlock at Portland Thorns FC, May 6.
 Save of the Year: Haley Kopmeyer vs. Sky Blue FC, July 22.

NWSL Player of the Month
 July: Megan Rapinoe

NWSL Team of the Month
 April: Jess Fishlock
 May: Nahomi Kawasumi
 June: Jess Fishlock and Megan Rapinoe
 July: Megan Rapinoe

NWSL Player of the Week
 Week 1: Haley Kopmeyer (8SV, 1GA vs. Sky Blue FC)
 Week 2: Jess Fishlock (1G, 1A vs. Houston Dash)
 Week 5: Nahomi Kawasumi (1G, 4A vs. Washington Spirit)
 Week 11: Megan Rapinoe (4G in two games)
 Week 14: Megan Rapinoe (3G vs. Sky Blue FC)
 Week 22: Jess Fishlock (2G, 1A vs. Washington Spirit)

NWSL Goal of the Week
 Week 4: Jess Fishlock at Portland Thorns FC
 Week 14: Megan Rapinoe vs. Sky Blue FC

Contract extensions

Transfers
For transfers in, dates listed are when the Reign FC officially signed the players to the roster. Transactions where only the rights to the players are acquired (e.g., draft picks) are not listed, and amateur call-ups are not considered official signings either. For transfers out, dates listed are when the Reign FC officially removed the players from its roster, not when they signed with another club. If a player later signed with another club, her new club will be noted, but the date listed here remains the one when she was officially removed from the Reign FC roster.

In

Draft picks 
Draft picks are not automatically signed to the team roster. Only those who are signed to a contract will be listed as transfers in. Only trades involving draft picks and executed during the 2017 NWSL College Draft will be listed in the notes.

Out

Offseason loans
 Lauren Barnes, Melbourne City
 Larissa Crummer, Melbourne City
 Jess Fishlock, Melbourne City
 Haley Kopmeyer, Canberra United
 Kristen McNabb, Melbourne Victory
 Carson Pickett, Brisbane Roar
 Rebekah Stott, Melbourne City
 Lydia Williams, Melbourne City

References

External links 

 

OL Reign seasons
Seattle Reign
2017 National Women's Soccer League season
American soccer clubs 2017 season
Seattle Reign